Stratford District Council is the territorial authority for the Stratford District of New Zealand.

The council consists of the mayor of Stratford, and ten ward councillors.

Composition

Councillors

 Mayor: 
 Four Rural Ward councillors
 Six Urban Ward councillors

History

The council was established in 1989, through the merger of the Stratford County Council (established in 1890) and the Stratford Borough Council (established in 1898).

References

External links
 Official website

Stratford District, New Zealand
Politics of Taranaki
Territorial authorities of New Zealand